Fortunato Maninetti (19 August 1920 – 9 January 1997) was an Italian rower. He competed at the 1948 Summer Olympics in London with the men's eight where they were eliminated in the semi-final.

References

External links
 

1920 births
1997 deaths
Italian male rowers
Olympic rowers of Italy
Rowers at the 1948 Summer Olympics
Sportspeople from Varese
European Rowing Championships medalists